John David Norman (October 13, 1927 – May 22, 2011) was an American pedophile and sex offender convicted numerous times between 1960 and 1998 on charges of child molestation and child pornography. Throughout his life, Norman operated various mailing services dedicating to distributing child pornography and arranging sex trafficking. Among these operations were the Odyssey Foundation based out of Dallas, Delta Project based out of Chicago, and Handy Andy based out of Pennsylvania. Norman is also known for his alleged ties to serial killers Dean Corll and John Wayne Gacy. He was eventually arrested for the last time in August 1987, in Illinois, and spent the rest of his life in state custody. He died in 2011, at age 83.

Biography 
Little is known about Norman's life, particularly his childhood and teenage years. He was born on October 13, 1927 in Oklahoma and is known to have lived in California, Colorado, Illinois, Pennsylvania and Texas. He used at least 20 aliases in his life, including John Paul Norman, Steve Gurwell, Alan Hitchcock, Charles Caldwell and Clarence McKay. In 1999, Norman was declared a sexually violent predator by the State of California and committed to Atascadero State Hospital. His psychiatrist, Dr. James Reavis, said about Norman; “John is an unrepentant adult male sex offender who in my opinion will go to his grave without any remorse for what he had done." Norman was released from Atascadero in October 2008 under strict conditions, but soon found himself in trouble again after handing a sexually suggestive note to a 19-year-old male clerk at an El Centro, California grocery store. Norman was recommitted to Coalinga State Hospital in March 2009 where he died in 2011.

Crimes

Early crimes 
Norman's criminal record dates back to the 1950s, when he was twice arrested for sexual assault in Houston in 1954 and 1956, though it is unknown if he was convicted of any crime in these cases. Court records and some news reports indicate he was first convicted of sex crimes in 1960. Norman was convicted of sexual assault in California in 1963 and federal court in 1970 for sending obscene literature through the mail. Norman received a 15-month prison sentence for the federal charge and served time at the McNeil Island Federal Penitentiary.

Dallas: Odyssey Foundation 
On August 13 1973, Dallas Police raided Norman's apartment at 3716 Cole Avenue based on a tip from a man in San Francisco, California that Norman was running a homosexual prostitution ring called the Odyssey Foundation. Police seized booklets bearing the name   International and containing photographs and contact information of teenage boys and young men and 30,000 index cards listing between 50,000 and 100,000 clients located in 35 states. Dallas Police Lt. Harold Hancock told the Chicago Tribune in May 1977 that prominent public figures and federal employees were among the names found in Norman's client list. Dallas Police sent to index cards to the State Department, a fact confirmed by State Department Counselor Matthew Nimetz. Nimetz stated that the State Department destroyed the index cards after determining them to be "not relevant to any fraud case concerning a passport". Norman was charged with possessing marijuana, conspiracy to commit sodomy and contributing to the delinquency of a juvenile and released on bail.

The Odyssey Foundation groomed teenage boys and young men from bus stations or because they were known to be homosexuals. These boys and young men (referred to as "fellows") were photographed for the booklets and were trafficked to clients (referred to as "sponsors") who paid for their "company". The "fellows" were trafficked across the country, staying with "sponsors" for 1 to 3 days on average before traveling to the next "sponsor".

Illinois: Delta Project 
After being released on bail in Dallas, Norman fled to Homewood, Illinois, a suburb of Chicago in late August or early September 1973. Using the name Steve Gurwell, Norman began living with Charles Rehling, an Odyssey client from Homewood. Norman had previously trafficked a 16-year-old boy from Independence, Missouri to Rehling, who went on a trip to Europe with the boy. During his time in Homewood, Norman sexually abused 10 teenage boys, enticing them with beer, showing them pornography and committing acts such as groping and oral sex upon them. Homewood Police received an anonymous call on October 31, 1973, stating that "Steve Gurwell" (Norman) was sexually abusing boys. Norman was out of town at the time, but they were able to locate Rehling who assisted them in their investigation. Norman returned to Homewood on November 14 and was arrested and charged with five counts of indecent liberties with a child and eight counts of contributing to the delinquency of a minor.

In the spring of 1976, while still awaiting trial on charges related to the Homewood crimes, Norman was bailed out of Cook County Jail for $36,000 by an unknown person from California. In December 1976, Norman was sentenced to four years in prison and sent to Pontiac Correctional Center. Shortly before he was bailed of Cook County Jail, Norman began his next sex operation, this operation called the Delta Project. Through the Delta Project, Norman began publishing a newsletter called Hermes. From Cook County Jail, Norman sent out three newsletters using the jail's printing press. Norman claimed that the Delta Project aimed to "provide educational, travel and self-development opportunities for qualified young men of character and integrity" and that "Delta-Dorms" were being established across the United States with each dorm having two to four "cadets" overseen by a "don". Police alleged that the "cadets" were underaged male prostitutes recruited in Chicago. In a May 1977 interview with the Chicago Tribune, Norman denied that Project Delta was sexual in nature and claimed to have sent the Hermes newsletter to over 7,000 people. At the time of the interview, police said that the Hermes newsletter had 5,000 subscribers and grossed over $300,000 per year.

Norman was paroled from Illinois prison in the fall of 1977, but was arrested again in Chicago in June 1978 for having sex with two underage boys and taking pornographic pictures of them. Norman was accused re-founding the Delta Project after being released from prison and ran it out of his apartment at 685 1/2 West Wrightwood Avenue, allegedly sending photos of the boys to a "don" in Canada. Norman re-named the Delta Project Creative Corps and M-C Publications. In a raid of his apartment, 20,000 pink index cards (or possibly 50,000 to 100,000) containing the names of customers were found.

Pennsylvania: Handy Andy 
Beginning in October 1983 and continuing through May 1984, Norman, using the alias Clarence McKay, produced and published a child pornography magazine called Handy Andy from his rural home in Aspers, Pennsylvania and a nearby motel. Norman exploited at least 20 teenage boys from the area, enticing them with drugs and alcohol and photographing them engaged in various sex acts. Norman fled Pennsylvania after his home was raided on May 31, 1984, but was captured in Bolingbrook, Illinois in October 1984, this time under the alias Patrick Nelson. Norman was released on bail in March 1985 and promptly fled again. He was captured in August 1987 in Urbana, Illinois and given a six-year prison sentence for crimes in Illinois. He was later extradited to Pennsylvania and sentenced to 18 months to 36 months in prison for charges related to Handy Andy. A 1986 news report focusing on Handy Andy stated that Norman was wanted in five different states for child sex crimes.

Later crimes 
Norman was convicted of child molestation in Colorado in 1988 and of distributing child pornography in California in 1995 and 1998. Norman was released from prison in California in 1999, but was declared a sexually violent predator and was detained indefinitely at Atascadero State Hospital. He was eventually released from Atascadero to the rural town of Boulevard, California under strict conditions. On February 2, 2009, Norman violated the conditions of his release by giving a note containing his contact information to a 19-year-old grocery bagger in El Centro. In March 2009 he was ordered back into state custody, this time at Coalinga State Hospital where he died in 2011.

Possible connection to Dean Corll 
Following Norman's 1973 Dallas arrest, news reports indicated police were investigating if Norman had any ties to serial killer Dean Corll. Dean Corll murdered at least 28 teenage boys and young men in Houston between 1970 and 1973. Corll was murdered himself on August 8, 1973, by his accomplice Elmer Wayne Henley, just days before Norman's arrest in Dallas. Norman had previously lived in Houston, as evidenced by his 1954 and 1956 arrests there. Additionally, the source who tipped off police about the Odyssey Foundation was a prostitute involved in the organization who got scared after an unidentified man in Houston requested his services. Elmer Henley gave a statement to police on August 9, 1973, that Corll told him that he was involved with a Dallas-based organization that "bought and sold boys, ran whores and dope and stuff like that". Police stated they did not think Corll's other accomplice, David Owen Brooks, was involved with the Odyssey Foundation, but did not rule out Corll and Henley as being involved, though they stated they had no evidence connecting them to the Odyssey Foundation. In 1975 however, Houston police reported finding pictures depicting 11 of Corll's victims during a raid on a child prostitution ring, once again raising the possibility of connections to the Odyssey Foundation.

Possible connection to John Wayne Gacy 
Norman is also alleged to have been connected to another serial killer, John Wayne Gacy. Gacy murdered at least 33 teenage boys and young men in Chicago between 1972 and 1978. A May 1977 report from Chicago Tribune stated that Norman's closest associate in running the Delta Project was a 25-year-old convicted murderer named Philip Paske. Paske was born June 11, 1953, and was a known accomplice of Norman during his time in Illinois. Known for his violent streak, he was implicated in several thefts and murders. The most notable example being three young boys murdered in 1977, one of which was set to testify against Norman. The link with Norman was made when it was discovered they shared a P.O. Box that was used for distributing Norman’s “newsletters”, which Paske helped facilitate. On August 16, 1977, The Chicago Tribune outed him when they found out that he worked for the City of Chicago as a lifeguard. Paske was described as being tall, blonde, having a bad complexion, and often dressed as a woman due to his transvestism. He died in 1998. 

Police alleged that Paske had taken over running the Delta Project after Norman was sent to prison. Paske was at Norman's apartment when it was raided and Norman arrested in 1978, though he was not arrested. Paske had worked for Gacy's construction company PDM contractors. Gacy implicated Paske, Norman and two other PDM employees as his accomplices in murder. In a 1992 interview, Gacy claimed Norman and the Delta Project were producing snuff films of young boys, possibly including some of Gacy's victims. At least two victims believed to have been murdered by Gacy, Kenneth Parker and Michael Marino, had last been seen alive close to where Norman lived.

See also 
Jeffrey Epstein
Ghislaine Maxwell

References 

1927 births
2011 deaths
20th-century American criminals
20th-century American LGBT people
American male criminals
American people convicted of child pornography offenses
American people convicted of child sexual abuse
Child sexual abuse in the United States
Criminals from California
Criminals from Texas
American gay men
LGBT people from California
LGBT people from Texas